Pokrovka is a rural locality (a village) in Usen-Ivanovsky Selsoviet, Belebeyevsky District, Bashkortostan, Russia. The population was 4 as of 2010. There is 1 street.

Geography 
Pokrovka is located 17 km northeast of Belebey (the district's administrative centre) by road. Usen-Ivanovskoye is the nearest rural locality.

References 

Rural localities in Belebeyevsky District